Sons of the Desert is a 1933 comedy film starring Laurel and Hardy.

Sons of the Desert may also refer to:

The Sons of the Desert, the official Laurel and Hardy appreciation society named after the 1933 film
Sons of the Desert (band), a band named for the film

See also
 Realm of the Desert Sons, a boardgame
 Desert Sun (disambiguation)